Top 100 España is a record chart published weekly by PROMUSICAE (Productores de Música de España), a non-profit organization composed by Spain and multinational record companies. This association tracks record sales (physical and digital) in Spain.

Albums

See also
List of number-one singles of 2008 (Spain)

References

2008 in Spanish music
Spain Albums
Spanish record charts